The Serbian Radical Party (SRS) is an ultranationalist political party in Serbia. It was founded in 1991, and its founder and current leader is Vojislav Šešelj.

The SRS was founded in 1991 as a merger of two minor right-wing parties whose leaders were Vojislav Šešelj and Tomislav Nikolić. They later became the President and Deputy President of the party respectively. During the first half of the 1990s, the SRS supported the ruling Socialist Party of Serbia regime, which had contributed greatly to the rise of SRS through the use of media. The party had strong support until the 2000 election, when they suffered a major defeat, but they would soon quickly rise up again to become one of the major parties. Šešelj led the party from its foundation in 1991 until his indictment in 2003, when he voluntarily surrendered to the ICTY to defend himself against charges of war crimes and crimes against humanity that he was alleged to have committed during the Croatian War of Independence and the Bosnian War. His deputy president Tomislav Nikolić assumed de facto leadership of the party until its split in 2008.

During the years of Nikolić's leadership, SRS became a moderate nationalist party, but because of disagreements with Šešelj, Nikolić took many of the high-ranking members of the party to form the Serbian Progressive Party (SNS), which would become the ruling party in 2012. After the split, Dragan Todorović assumed de facto leadership, and the party went into a major decline, only pulling 4% of the vote in 2012 and 2% in 2014, the first time that SRS was not represented in the parliament. Shortly after Šešelj's return to Serbia in 2014, the party gained back some of its popularity, officially returning to its far-right roots. The SRS placed third with 8% of the vote in the 2016 election. In late 2019, the party went into decline again, and in the 2020 election it ended up only with 2% of the vote and gaining no seats in the parliament again.

The SRS is positioned on the far-right on the political spectrum, supporting the creation of a Greater Serbia. It is Eurosceptic and Russophilic, was formerly considered anti-Western, and was described as "neofascist" in the 1990s due to its vocal support of ultranationalism. Regarding social issues, SRS is traditionalist, and has been described as right-wing populist. It also holds local branches in some of the neighboring states.

Ideology 

The party's core ideology is based on Serbian nationalism and the goal of creating a Greater Serbia. The party is also strongly opposed to European integration (euroscepticism) and globalization, advocating closer ties with Russia instead. The SRS is extremely critical of the International Criminal Tribunal for the former Yugoslavia (ICTY), where Šešelj was incarcerated from 2003 to 2014.  The party regards former general Ratko Mladić and former Republika Srpska president Radovan Karadžić as "Serbian heroes".

In 2007, the party advocated the use of military force to prevent the independence of Kosovo.

Due to Tomislav Nikolić's support for the accession of Serbia to the European Union conflicting with the party's original hardline policy, Nikolić was expelled in 2008. With his supporters breaking apart from the SRS, he founded the Serbian Progressive Party (SNS) which succeeded the SRS as the country's leading party.

History

Foundation 

The Serbian Radical Party (SRS) was formed on 23 February 1991 by the merger of Vojislav Šešelj's Serbian Chetnik Movement (SČP) and the National Radical Party (NRS). The SČP had been formed in 1990, although it was denied official registration due to its overt identification with the historical Chetniks. Formation of the new party followed Šešelj's breakaway from the Serbian Renewal Movement (SPO) due to internal quarrels with Vuk Drašković; the SPO having been founded by the merger of Šešelj's former Serbian Freedom Movement and Drašković's faction from the Serbian National Renewal. Šešelj was chosen as the first president of the SRS while Tomislav Nikolić, a member of the NRS, became deputy president.

Rise under SPS 
Led by Milošević, the Socialist Party (SPS) contributed greatly to the rise of the SRS through its use of the media. With the SRS allowed to promulgate its ultranationalist views on state television, the SPS could present itself as a comparatively moderate, yet still patriotic party. Šešelj promoted popular notions of an "international conspiracy against the Serbs," the foremost of which involved Germany, the Vatican, the CIA, Italy, Turkey, as well as the centrist Serbian political parties. Such conspiracy theories were also promoted by Milošević-controlled media. In 1991, Šešelj became a Member of Parliament as an independent candidate, and created a belligerent image by engaging in physical fights with opponents of the government.

The 22.6% of the vote won by the SRS in the 1992 parliamentary election confirmed the party's rapid rise and made it the second largest parliamentary party. Šešelj campaigned for the election on issues such as driving Albanians out of Kosovo to Albania, expelling Muslims from Sandžak, and forcing the Croats out of Vojvodina. Having helped engineer the party's election to parliament, the SPS formed an informal coalition with the SRS, and collaborated on ousting moderate politicians from public office.

Milošević breaks with SRS 
By late 1993 the parties had turned against each other. Milošević saw it necessary to change his policies and distance himself from the SRS in order for his new peacemaking orientation to be taken seriously by the West, as well as to counter the effects of United Nations sanctions against the country. Many socialists also feared competition from the party based on its strong growth record. As discord erupted among the opposition including the SRS, Milošević called new elections in 1993. These cut SRS support almost in half, while the SPS increased its share of the vote from 28% to 38%. Although most people had grown tired of the wars, UN sanctions and the catastrophic economic situation, the SRS had also been subjected to powerful state propaganda and exclusion by the media. Following Milošević's agreement to the Dayton accords in 1995 to bring peace to Bosnia, Šešelj denounced Milošević as "the worst traitor in Serbian history", and likened the event to Serbia's greatest defeat since the Battle of Kosovo fought against the Ottoman Empire in 1389.

In 1995, Šešelj and the SRS joined in a technical coalition with the centrist Democratic Party (DS) and the conservative Democratic Party of Serbia (DSS). This gave Šešelj a degree of democratic legitimacy, although the coalition withered away by the end of the same year.

Kosovo war and Milošević's overthrow 
When Šešelj beat the SPS candidate for the 1997 presidential election, despite the contest being declared invalid due to low turnout, he was again brought into the Serbian government. In 1998 the SRS and SPO entered the so-called "war" government, and as Deputy Prime Minister, Šešelj passed new information laws and helped launch propaganda offensives against Kosovo Albanians. U.S. officials in turn branded him a "fascist", while the U.S. Department of State declared that they would never deal with him. Following the 1999 NATO occupation of Kosovo, Šešelj resigned from government until his party was enticed to re-enter the administration by the SPS. As the party had held posts under Milošević's regime, it was excluded from the Democratic Opposition of Serbia (DOS), and suffered a major defeat in the 2000 parliamentary election when Milošević was ousted.

Indictment of Šešelj 
During the Yugoslav Wars some SRS supporters including Šešelj were active in paramilitary units loyal to the federal government, serving as his "iron fist" during military campaigns. Milošević's regime at times supported Šešelj and provided him with arms, whilst at others it accused him of war crimes. The SRS was also provided with resources to establish paramilitary volunteer forces such as the White Eagles. As the SRS protested against Milošević's extradition to the International Criminal Tribunal for the former Yugoslavia (ICTY) in 2001, Milošević urged his supporters to vote for the SRS rather than his own SPS. The ICTY also indicted Šešelj, who has been on trial since 2007 following his surrender in 2003. Deputy President Nikolić became the new de facto SRS leader and presented a more moderate face, with a new approach to international cooperation and a vision of Serbia acting as a "link between the West and the East."

Nikolić leadership 
During the 2003 parliamentary election, the SRS condemned cooperation with the war crimes tribunal, corruption scandals in government, poor living standards, and slightly moderated its formerly aggressive rhetoric. While it won a clear plurality with 28% of the vote and 82 seats, the party was still viewed as a pariah by its democratic rivals and was thus left in opposition. In the 2007 parliamentary election it won 29% of the vote and 81 seats. The SRS caucus in parliament elected Nikolić as its president and Aleksandar Vučić vice-president. Nikolić was later chosen as parliamentary speaker, supported by the DSS amidst a deadlock in coalition talks. He stepped down just five days later, as the DS and DSS agreed to form a coalition government.

At the National Assembly's first session on 14 February 2007, politicians voted overwhelmingly to reject the proposal by UN Special Envoy Martti Ahtisaari on the preliminary resolution of the status of Kosovo. New elections were called in 2008 as the DS-DSS coalition collapsed due to EU recognition of Kosovo's declaration of independence. In the 2008 parliamentary election the SRS again won 29% of the vote, and 78 seats, leading to the formation of a DS-SPS-led government coalition. The party also won 17 seats in the Kosovska Mitrovica-based Community Assembly of Kosovo and Metohija consisting of Kosovan Serb municipalities who defied Kosovo's declaration of independence.

2008 split 
After disagreements with Šešelj, on 8 September 2008, Nikolić formed the new parliamentary group Napred Srbijo! ("Forward Serbia!") along with a number of other SRS members. Šešelj responded with a letter on 11 September addressed to SRS members, in which he condemned the Nikolić group as "traitors" and "Western puppets", while calling on SRS members to remain loyal to the ideologies of "Serbian nationalism, anti-globalism, and Russophilia." Nikolić and his group were officially expelled from the SRS the next day, in response to which Nikolić announced that he would form his own party. On 14 September, SRS general secretary Aleksandar Vučić also resigned from the SRS. Nikolić and Vučić then launched the Serbian Progressive Party (SNS) on 21 October of the same year.

Following their departure, Dragan Todorović took over as the party's acting leader from Nikolić; however the office of deputy chairman was officially abolished. By April 2011 the SRS had about 7% of support in opinion polls, while the SNS and its coalition partners held about 40%. In the 2012 parliamentary election the Radical Party received only 4.63% of the popular vote, thus failing to cross the 5% threshold to enter parliament for the first time in the party's history.

Šešelj's return 

With their leader back in Serbia in 2014, the party campaigned for the parliamentary election of 2016 aiming to restore its presence prior to 2008.

International relations 
The Serbian Radical Party maintains ties with the Liberal Democratic Party of Russia and had ties with the French National Front party in the 1990s. The SRS also has minimal ties with the far-right Golden Dawn party in Greece, focusing on religious similarities, and the Forza Nuova party in Italy.

The party counted Iraq's Saddam Hussein and the Arab Socialist Ba'ath Party as one of its political and financial backers until the 2003 invasion of Iraq, as the parties found common cause in defiance of the United States. Similar sentiment led the party to back Libya's Muammar Gaddafi following the 2011 military intervention in Libya by NATO. Serbia and Libya had maintained good relations since Gaddafi vocally opposed NATO intervention in Serbia in the 1990s, while he also backed Serbia's opposition to Kosovo's independence. The SRS has also expressed support for Syrian president Bashar al-Assad following the Syrian Civil War. Šešelj advocates for a neutral position on the Israel-Palestine conflict, balancing Serbia's strong relations with both countries.

On 9 March 2016 Šešelj and Zmago Jelinčič, president of the Slovenian National Party, signed an agreement with the intention of bringing their parties closer in terms of partnership and political alliance.

Presidents of the Serbian Radical Party

Acting leaders during the incarceration of Šešelj 
Šešelj was incarcerated at the International Criminal Tribunal for the former Yugoslavia (ICTY) from 2003 to 2014.
Ref:

Electoral results

Parliamentary elections 

 Acting leaders (2003–2014)

Years in government (1991– )

Presidential elections

Positions held 
Major positions held by Serbian Radical Party members:

See also

 Serbian nationalism
 Greater Serbia
 Party of Serb Radicals
 Serbian Radical Party "9th January"
 Serbian Radical Party of the Republika Srpska

References
 Notes

 Footnotes

Bibliography

External links

Serbian Radical Party Official website 
Facebook
Twitter

 
Conservative parties in Serbia
Eurosceptic parties in Serbia
Far-right political parties
Far-right politics in Serbia
Nationalist parties in Serbia
Political parties established in 1991
Serbian irredentism
Anti-Islam sentiment in Europe
Organizations that oppose LGBT rights
Right-wing populism in Serbia
1991 establishments in Serbia
Eastern Orthodoxy and far-right politics
Serb nationalist parties
Right-wing populist parties
Neo-fascist parties